Kamuthi Solar Power Project is a photovoltaic power station spread over an area of  in Kamuthi, Ramanathapuram district, 90 km from Madurai, in the state of Tamil Nadu, India. The project was commissioned by Adani Power. With a generating capacity of 648 MWp at a single location, it is the world's 12th largest solar park based on capacity.

ABB commissioned five sub-stations to connect the solar park with the National Grid on 13 June 2016. The solar plant consists of 2.5 million solar modules, 380,000 foundations, 27,000 metres of structures, 576 inverters, 154 transformers, and almost 6,000 km of cables. Construction of the structures needed to mount the solar panels required 30,000 tonnes of galvanised steel. Around 8,500 workers installed an average of 11 MW of capacity per day to complete the project within 8 months.

The entire solar park is connected to a 400 kV substation of the Tamil Nadu Transmission Corp. The solar panels are cleaned daily by a self-charged robotic system.

Given the solar resource of around 2100 kWh/(m2*yr) an annual generation of 1.35 TWh/yr may be possible. This corresponds to a capacity factor (or average power) of 24% of the peak capacity 648 MWp. Assuming a technical life time of 25 years the investment cost is 700 MUSD/(25*1.35 TWh) = 2 US cent/kWh.

Controversy 
The plant relies on approximately 200,000 liters of water to keep its 25,000 modules clean each year, which has apparently been sourced from borewells nearby without consent of the respective district authority.

See also 

 Solar power in India
 Renewable energy in India

References

Photovoltaic power stations in India
2016 establishments in Tamil Nadu
Ramanathapuram district
Power stations in Tamil Nadu
Adani Group